The Russell–Einstein Manifesto was issued in London on 9 July 1955 by Bertrand Russell in the midst of the Cold War. It highlighted the dangers posed by nuclear weapons and called for world leaders to seek peaceful resolutions to international conflict. The signatories included eleven pre-eminent intellectuals and scientists, including Albert Einstein, who signed it just days before his death on 18 April 1955. A few days after the release, philanthropist Cyrus S. Eaton offered to sponsor a conference—called for in the manifesto—in Pugwash, Nova Scotia, Eaton's birthplace. This conference, held in July 1957, was to be the first of the Pugwash Conferences on Science and World Affairs.

Background

The first detonation of an atomic weapon took place on 16 July 1945 in the desert north of Alamogordo, New Mexico. On 6 August 1945, the US dropped the Little Boy bomb on the Japanese city of Hiroshima. Three days later, it dropped the Fat Man bomb on Nagasaki. At least 100,000 civilians were killed outright by these two bombings.

On 18 August 1945, the Glasgow Forward published "The Bomb and Civilisation," the first known recorded comment by Bertrand Russell on atomic weapons, which he began composing the day Nagasaki was bombed. It contained threads that would later appear in the manifesto:

After learning of the bombing of Hiroshima and seeing an impending nuclear arms race, Joseph Rotblat, the only scientist to leave the Manhattan Project on moral grounds, remarked that he "became worried about the whole future of mankind."

Over the years that followed, Russell and Rotblat worked on efforts to curb nuclear proliferation, collaborating with Albert Einstein and other scientists to compose what became known as the Russell–Einstein Manifesto.

Press conference, 9 July 1955
The manifesto was released during a press conference at Caxton Hall, London. Rotblat, who chaired the meeting, describes it as follows:

Russell had begun the conference by stating:

Synopsis
The manifesto called for a conference where scientists would assess the dangers posed to the survival of humanity by weapons of mass destruction. Emphasis was placed on the meeting being politically neutral. It extended the question of nuclear weapons to all people and governments. One particular phrase is quoted often, including by Rotblat upon receipt of the Nobel Peace Prize in 1995::320

The beginnings of the Pugwash Conferences
The manifesto called for an international conference, and was originally planned by Jawaharlal Nehru to be held in India. This was delayed by the outbreak of the Suez Crisis. Aristotle Onassis offered to finance a meeting in Monaco, but this was rejected. Instead, Cyrus Eaton, a Canadian industrialist who had known Russell since 1938, offered to finance the conference in his hometown of Pugwash, Nova Scotia. The Russell–Einstein Manifesto became the Pugwash Conferences' founding charter. The first of the conferences was held in July 1957 in Pugwash.

Signatories to the manifesto

With the exception of Infeld, all of the signatories of the Russell–Einstein Manifesto are Nobel Laureates, although Rotblat was not at the time.

See also
 Mainau Declaration
 Mutually assured destruction

References

External links
 The Russell-Einstein Manifesto, 9 July 1955
 Pugwash Conferences on Science and World Affairs
 Op-Ed: The 50-Year Shadow by Joseph Rotblat, New York Times, 17 May 2005.
 Meeting the Russell–Einstein Challenge to Humanity by David Krieger, October 2004.
 Pugwash and Russell's Legacy by John R. Lenz.

Peace movements
Works by Albert Einstein
Essays by Bertrand Russell
Nuclear weapons policy
Political manifestos
1955 in international relations
1955 documents